|}

The Prix Daphnis is a Group 3 flat horse race in France open to three-year-old thoroughbreds. It is run at Deauville over a distance of 1,600 metres (about 1 mile), and it is scheduled to take place each year in August.

History
The event was established for colts and geldings in 1921 alongside the Prix Chloé, a similar contest for fillies. The two races were named after the characters Daphnis and Chloe from a work by the Greek novelist Longus. The story was popularised in France by the translation of Paul-Louis Courier. Both races were originally held at Le Tremblay, and they usually took place in late April or early May.

The Prix Daphnis was initially contested over 1,600 metres. It served as a trial for the Poule d'Essai des Poulains. It was staged at Longchamp from 1940 to 1942, and returned to Le Tremblay in 1943.

The event was rescheduled to take place on the eve of the Poule d'Essai des Poulains in 1961. From this point its distance was 1,800 metres. Le Tremblay closed in 1967, and the race moved to Longchamp the following year. It was transferred to Évry in 1973, and switched to July in 1977.

With the exception of a single running at Longchamp in 1981, the Prix Daphnis remained at Évry until 1995. For periods thereafter it was held at Maisons-Laffitte (1996–98, 2002–03) and Chantilly (1999–2001, 2004).

The race returned to Longchamp in 2005. It was extended to 1,850 metres in 2010. It was run at Compiègne in 2013 and Chantilly again in 2014. Longchamp closed for redevelopment in October 2015 and the race was run at Chantilly in 2016 and Maisons-Laffitte in 2017. In 2018 the Prix Daphnis underwent major changes, being opened to fillies, transferred to Deauville's August meeting and reduced to 1,600 metres again.

Records
Leading jockey (5 wins):
 Thierry Jarnet – Tel Quel (1991), Steinbeck (1992), Kouroun (2001), So Beautiful (2012), Almanaar (2015)

Leading trainer (10 wins):
 André Fabre – Thrill Show (1986), Tel Quel (1991), Steinbeck (1992), Signe Divin (1994), Alrassaam (1999), Bernebeau (2002), Cacique (2004), Golden Century (2009), Last Kingdom (2017), Delaware (2019)

Leading owner (7 wins):
 Marcel Boussac – Grazing (1921, dead-heat), Nosca (1942), Coaraze (1945), Djelal (1947), Galcador (1950), Faublas (1953), Alvedas (1973)

Winners since 1978

 The 2006 winner Dilek was later exported to Hong Kong and renamed Viva Macau.

 The 2011 winner Ziyarid subsequently raced in Hong Kong as Cheers Joy.

Earlier winners

 1921: Grazing / Net *
 1922: Joyeux Drille
 1923: Sir Gallahad
 1924: Optimist
 1925: Aethelstan
 1926: Bad Leg
 1927: Licteur
 1928: Orosmade
 1929: Argonaute
 1930: Bull Dog
 1931: Ivan le Terrible
 1932: Ronflon
 1933: Jumbo
 1934: Shining Tor
 1935: Comilon
 1936: Ambrose Light
 1937: Drap d'Or
 1938: Tranquil
 1939: Mac Kann
 1940: Flying Call
 1941: Pampre d'Or
 1942: Nosca
 1943: Fanatique
 1944: Tango
 1945: Coaraze
 1946: Sayani
 1947: Djelal
 1948:
 1949: Oghio
 1950: Galcador
 1951: Free Man
 1952: Faubourg
 1953: Faublas
 1954:
 1955: Belebat
 1956: Polic
 1957: Mourne
 1958: Pres du Feu
 1959: Savarus
 1960: Djebel Traffic
 1961:
 1962: Montfleur
 1963: Garde Coeur
 1964: Sigebert
 1965: Sunday
 1966: Silver Shark
 1967: Blue Tom
 1968: Chimist Amber
 1969: Bergano
 1970: Larko
 1971: Maroun
 1972: Tom Playfair
 1973: Alvedas
 1974: Schoeller
 1975: Wronsky
 1976: Happy New Year
 1977: Solicitor

* The 1921 race was a dead-heat and has joint winners.

See also
 List of French flat horse races

References

 France Galop / Racing Post:
 , 
 france-galop.com – A Brief History: Prix Daphnis.
 galop.courses-france.com – Prix Daphnis – Palmarès depuis 1980.
 galopp-sieger.de – Prix Daphnis.
 horseracingintfed.com – International Federation of Horseracing Authorities – Prix Daphnis (2018).
 pedigreequery.com – Prix Daphnis – Longchamp.

Flat horse races for three-year-olds
Longchamp Racecourse
Horse races in France
Recurring sporting events established in 1921